Nellikkuppam is the legislative assembly in Cuddalore district, that includes the city, Nellikuppam. Nellikkupam assembly constituency is a part of Cuddalore (Lok Sabha constituency). It is one of the 234 State Legislative Assembly Constituencies in Tamil Nadu, in India.

Members of Legislative Assembly

Tamil Nadu

Election results

2006

2001

1996

1991

1989

1984

1980

1977

1971

1967

1962

1957

References

External links
 

Former assembly constituencies of Tamil Nadu
Cuddalore district